Dryadonycteris capixaba is a species of leaf-nosed bat found in South America. It is the only species within the genus Dryadonycteris

Taxonomy and etymology
It was described as a new species in 2012. It was described in part from museum specimens that had been identified as the lesser long-tongued bat. The holotype was collected in 2011 in Linhares, Brazil. It is within the subfamily Glossophaginae. The genus name Dryadonycteris was derived from Carl Friedrich Philipp von Martius's name for Atlantic Forest, "Dryades." "Dryades" was derived from Greek dryad, or "wood nymph." "Dryadonycteris" literally means "bat from Dryades," here meaning Atlantic Forest. The species name "capixaba" is from the Tupia language meaning "a native of the state of Espírito Santo."

Description
It is similar in appearance to Lichonycteris and Choeroniscus species. It has a triangular nose-leaf.

Biology and ecology
It is nectarivorous.

Range and habitat
It is currently only known from Brazil.

References

Mammals described in 2012
Bats of Brazil
Phyllostomidae